Institute for Democracy in South Africa v African National Congress is an important case in South African administrative and constitutional law, concerning the right of access to information. The applicants sought access to the donation records of certain political parties, but the latter were judged to be private bodies in relation to those records. Section 8(1) of the Promotion of Access to Information Act (PAIA) recognises that a body may be "public" or "private" for the purposes of the Act depending on whether the record in question "relates to the exercise of a power or the performance of a function as a public body or as a private body."

See also 
 South African administrative law
 Access to information in South African law

References 
 Institute for Democracy in South Africa and Others v African National Congress and Others 2005 (5) SA 39 (C); [2005] 3 All SA 45 (C); 2005 (10) BCLR 995 (C)
 C. Hoexter Administrative Law in South Africa 2 ed (2012).

Notes 

2005 in South African law
2005 in case law
South African case law